Sessenbach is an Ortsgemeinde – a community belonging to a Verbandsgemeinde – in the Westerwaldkreis in Rhineland-Palatinate, Germany.

Geography

The community lies in the Westerwald between Koblenz and Siegen in the Kannenbäckerland ("Jug Bakers’ Land", a small region known for its pottery industry). Through the community flows the Sessenbach, which belongs to the Rhine drainage basin. Sessenbach belongs to the Verbandsgemeinde of Ransbach-Baumbach, a kind of collective municipality. Its seat is in the like-named town.

History
In 1321, the village had its first documentary mention as Sinsinbach. Archaeological finds have led to the conclusion that there was once a Celtic dwelling pit settlement here.

At first documentary mention in 1321, Luther von Isenburg held Sinsinbach in fief. The Isenburg estate and the Wollenschlägers Höfchen at Sessenbach were in Isenburg hands until 1664, whereafter they passed to the Electorate of Trier. The Saynhof (1331, Hof “Uf der Seijne”) found itself in many owner's hands, ending up in 1723 under the Oberwerth Monastery's ownership. Isenburg-Grenzau owned a share of the tithes from Sessenbach in 1600.

Today, Sessenbach has roughly 550 inhabitants living in 160 houses with all together 230 dwellings in an area of 2.8 km2.

In the 20th century, the villagers’ main livelihoods lay in agriculture and ceramics. In the realm of development in living conditions, Sessenbach has kept its “idyllic” village character, and village and club life here are important to the local people. Various clubs allow members to indulge their interests.

Since 1972 Sessenbach has belonged to the Verbandsgemeinde of Ransbach-Baumbach.

Politics

The municipal council is made up of 12 council members who were elected in a majority vote in a municipal election on 13 June 2004.

Economy and infrastructure

Autobahn A 48 with its Höhr-Grenzhausen (AS 12) interchange lies 6 km away. The nearest InterCityExpress stop is the railway station at Montabaur on the Cologne-Frankfurt high-speed rail line.

References

External links
Sessenbach 

Municipalities in Rhineland-Palatinate
Westerwaldkreis